The coat of arms of the Republic of Seychelles shows a shield, in which a giant tortoise is located on green grounds. On the ground there is a coco de mer palm tree.  Behind it there is a blue sea with two islands and a sail ship to be seen. The shield is enthroned by a silver helmet, on which a white-tailed tropicbird is located above blue and white waves. The shield is supported by two white sailfish. Beneath the shield the motto of Seychelles is stated: "Finis Coronat Opus" (a phrase traditionally attributed to Ovid) (Latin for "The End Crowns the Work").

History

First coat of arms 
After the separation of Seychelles from the Mauritius in 1903, a new badge for Seychelles was adopted. The new badge was designed by Major-General Charles George Gordon. The badge consisted of a disc with a picture of the coast of Mahé with a Coco de mer on the shore, some shrubs and a giant Tortoise . On a listel in the base is the motto Finis Coronat Opvs.

Second coat of arms 
The second coat of arms was embellished and augmented in 1961. The coat of arms was designed by Mrs. Alec McEwen of Toronto. On the coat of arms, a second island was added, symbolizing the other 114 islands of the archipelago. In the ocean, a schooner symbolizes the traffic between the islands. Around the badge is a bordure with stylized waves and the title and the motto of the colony.

Current coat of arms

First variant
The current coat of arms was given by the Royal Warrant of Queen Elizabeth II, dated 27 May 1976.

Second variant
On 18 June 1996, by the National Symbols Act of 1996, the colour of the coat of arms were changed to a brighter color. The most significant change was the change of the torse on the helmet, from white-blue-red (based on the older Seychellois flag), to blue-yellow-red-white-green (the color of the current flag of Seychelles).

Current official description
The coat of arms of Seychelles is officially described as follows:

ARMS: Azure a Female Coco de Mer Palm (Lodoicea maldivica) issuant from in base a grassy mount thereon a Giant Tortoise (Testudo gigantea) the whole in front of water rising therefrom to the dexter an Island and sailing thereon a two-masted Schooner in full sail all proper.

CREST: Upon a Wreath Azure, Or, Gules and Vert above water barry wavy Azure and Argent a White Tailed Tropic Bird (Phaethon lepturus lepturus) volant proper.

SUPPORTERS: On either side a Sail Fish (Istiophorus gladius) proper.

MOTTO: FINIS CORONAT OPUS

Gallery

References

External links
 New National Symbols of the Republic of the Seychelles, Adopted 18th June 1996 

Seychelles
National symbols of Seychelles
Seychelles
Seychelles
Seychelles
Seychelles
Seychelles
Seychelles